Goell is a surname. Notable people with the surname include:

Kermit Goell (1915–1997), American songwriter and archeologist, brother of Theresa
Theresa Goell (1901–1985), American archaeologist

See also
Goel
Gotell
List of valkyrie names